Dalton Armoury is a Canadian Forces Primary Reserve facility located at 20 Scarsdale Road in Scarborough, Ontario, Canada. It was opened on April 22, 2006.

The building was leased primarily to house Buffs Company, of The Queen's Own Rifles of Canada, as part of the Land Force Reserve Restructure (LFRR) program. An outcome of LFRR was the decision to expand the CF's community footprint into high density areas that are too far from current armouries by public transit.

The building is named after Colonel Charles Dalton DSO KStJ, ED, and Colonel Elliot Dalton DSO ED, decorated members of The Queen's Own Rifles of Canada who fought in World War II.

Lodger units
The armoury is currently home to:

Buffs Company, The Queen's Own Rifles of Canada
 2881 Queen's Own Rifles Cadet Corps

See also
 Moss Park Armoury
 Fort York Armoury
 Denison Armoury
 Oakville Armoury
 Col J.R. Barber Armoury

References

Armouries in Canada
Queen's Own Rifles of Canada
Scarborough, Toronto